Juan Carlos Valenzuela may refer to:

Juan Carlos Valenzuela (footballer) (born 1984), Mexican footballer 
Juan Carlos Valenzuela (politician) (born 1970), Honduran politician